Walterstone is a village and civil parish in Herefordshire, England, near the Welsh border and the Brecon Beacons National Park,  south-west of Hereford. The parish had a population of 97 in the 2001 UK Census and is grouped with Craswall, Llanveynoe and Longtown to form Longtown Group Parish Council for administrative purposes.

There is a motte-and-bailey castle in the village to the west of St Mary's church and an Iron Age hill fort on high ground  to the east.  The River Monnow and the Welsh Marches railway line share a valley south-east of the village.

The Grade II listed parish church of St Mary is part of the Ewyas Harold group of parishes. In the chancel, there is early 17th-century stained-glass depicting the quartered arms of the Cecils, brought from the nearby Allt Yr Ynys. The churchyard cross is listed Grade II*.

The 300-year-old village pub, the Carpenter's Arms, is situated next to the church and has been in the same family for the last 100 years.

In the 18th century, a Roman mosaic was reported to have been found in the parish.  The exact site is not known but is thought to be in the Coed-y-Grafel area north of the village.

References

External links

 Walterstone, GENUKI genealogy web portal
 List of monuments in the parish
 Please note that most of the sites are on private property and are not open to the public
 St Mary's Church

Villages in Herefordshire
Civil parishes in Herefordshire